Helwan is a suburban district in the Southern Area of Cairo, Egypt. The area of Helwan witnessed prehistoric, ancient Egyptian, Roman and Muslim era activity. More recently it was designated as a city until as late as the 1960s, before it became contiguous with the city of Cairo and was incorporated as a district. For a brief period between April 2008 and April 2011 it was redesignated as a city, and served as the capital of the now defunct Helwan Governorate that was split from Cairo and Giza governorates, before being re-incorporated back into them. The kism of Helwan had a population of 521,239 in the 2017 census.

History 
The Helwan and Isnian cultures of the late Epipalaeolithic, and their Ouchata retouch methods for creating microlithic tools may have contributed to the development of the Harifian cultural assemblage of the Sinai, which may have introduced Proto-Semitic languages into the Middle East. Around 3000 to 2600 BC, there was a cemetery near Helwan serving the city of Memphis.

The city of Helwan was founded in 689 CE as Fustat's temporary replacement as the capital of Umayyad Egypt by its governor Abd al-Aziz ibn Marwan, who died in the new city.

The Khedivial Astronomical Observatory was built here 1903–1904, and was used to observe Halley's comet. Egypt's oldest and largest private psychiatric clinic, the Behman Hospital, was constructed here in 1939.

During the early part of the 20th century, the city was the site of RAF Helwan, a major British airfield, which was later used by the Egyptian Air Force.

In 1959 Helwan was chosen to serve as a site of a major industrial city, as part of President Gamal Abdel Nasser's attempts to industrialize Egypt. Throughout the 1960s, it developed into a massive steelworks zone, with numerous automobile factories being built. The site continues to use electricity from the Aswan Dam and iron ore from Egypt's western deserts. Helwan was gradually transformed into a mass suburb of Cairo for the working class.

Helwan Governorate

In April 2008, the Helwan Governorate was split from the Cairo Governorate, encompassing most of the districts outside the ring road, as well as all satellite cities (15th May, New Cairo, Shorouk, Badr, and Huckstep) and the undeveloped desert.  Helwan was elevated to city status, incorporating the districts of al-Ma'sara, 'Ain Helwan (qism Helwan), and al-Mustaqbal (prev. 15th May), and became the capital of the new governorate. Maadi was also elevated to city status, incorporating the districts of Maadi, Tora, al-Tibin and al-Nahda. Helwan Governorate later incorporated the rural counties (marakiz, sing. markaz) of Al-Saf and Atfih from the Giza Governorate's former jurisdiction east of the Nile.

Following the dissolution of the Helwan Governorate in April 2011, all cities and districts returned to their previous statuses, and the city of Helwan was reincorporated as a district.

Ecclesiastical history 
Alphocranon was important enough in the Late Roman province of Arcadia Aegypti to be a suffragan of its Metropolitan Archbishop of Oxyrhynchus.

Its bishop, Harpocration, participated in the First Council of Nicaea in 325. The bishopric is mentioned in two Notitiae Episcopatuum.

Titular see 
No longer a residential diocese, Alphocranon is today listed by the Catholic Church as a Latin Catholic titular bishopric, nominally restoring the diocese since 1933, but no incumbent is recorded.

Administrative subdivisions and population 
In the 2017 census, Helwan had 521,239 residents in 8 shiakhas:

Economy 

Local industry includes iron, steel, textiles and cement. The area has hot sulphur springs, an astronomical observatory, the Helwan University and a burial chamber (discovered in 1946). It is the terminus of Cairo's light rail Metro Line 1. Also trams in Helwan serve the people.

Climate 
Köppen-Geiger climate classification system classifies its climate as hot desert (BWh). Owing to its proximity to Cairo, its average monthly temperatures are quite similar, but it has a quite different distribution of humidity and its diurnal average temperature variation is slightly larger.

Notability 

 Sadd el-Kafara, one of the earliest prehistoric man-made dams in the world.
 Harold Knox-Shaw, one of the earliest astronomy specialists in Helwan Observatory.
 John Reynolds, one of the earliest astronomy specialists in Helwan Observatory & president of the English Royal Astronomical Society between 1935 and 1937.
 Operation Priha: Helwan was targeted in Priha-1.
 Tewfik Pasha died in his palace at Helwan.
 The 6th Armoured Division (South Africa) was present at Helwan during WW II.
 The 82-BM-37 is known as "Helwan M-69 82mm mortar".
 Abdul Rahman Hassan Azzam Pasha lived in Helwan.
 Moataz Eno was born in Helwan.
 Cars produced at Helwan:
 Nasr 128
 Sahin 1.4S
 Sahin 1.6SL
 Zastava Florida In
 Fiat 1100
 Fiat 1300/1500
 Fiat 2300
 Polski Fiat 125p/FSO 125p
 FSO Polonez MR'83/MR'85
 FSO Polonez MR'86/MR'87/MR'89
 Fiat Ritmo
 Fiat Regata
 Fiat Tempra
 The English Middle East Command Camouflage Directorate was present in Helwan.
 Geoffrey Barkas designed the Operation Bertram while heading Middle East Command Camouflage Directorate.
 RAF Helwan was a British airfield.
 No. 112 Squadron RAF was stationed at Helwan.
 A crater on the 951 Gaspra asteroid was named after the spa city of Helwan.
 Inebu-hedj

See also 
 List of ancient Egyptian sites, including sites of temples
 15th of May
 Greater Cairo
 Helwan retouch
 Helwan University
 Maadi

References

External links 

  Helwan on Wikivoyage
 GCatholic

Populated places in Cairo Governorate
7th-century establishments in the Umayyad Caliphate
Populated places established in the 7th century